Paul O'Grady: For the Love of Dogs is a multi-award winning British reality documentary television series set at Battersea Dogs & Cats Home and presented by Paul O'Grady. It has won numerous awards throughout its time on air.

The show is made by MultiStory Media and premiered on ITV on 3 September 2012.

Format
Throughout the series, Paul meets members of the Battersea staff to talk about the dogs in their care, including head vet Shaun Opperman and head of canine welfare training Ali Taylor. In each episode, Paul meets a few of the dogs who come to Battersea as strays or because their owners can't look after them anymore, and follows each dog's progress through the home.

O'Grady commented that he had wanted to do such a show for years and that he took to it with an "enthusiasm that surprised everyone except me". Although scheduled to initially film at the Battersea Dogs and Cats Home for six days, he stayed as a volunteer for six months. At the end of the first series, O'Grady was invited to become an ambassador for Battersea Dogs and Cats Home.

Transmissions

Episodes

Series 1

Series 2

Series 3

Series 4

Series 5

Series 6

Series 7

Series 8

Series 9

Specials

Awards
Paul O'Grady: For the Love of Dogs has won a number of awards. The show has won two consecutive National Television Awards for 'Most Popular Factual Entertainment Programme' in 2013 and 2014. It won again in 2019 after beating Gogglebox for the first time in five years.

On 14 October 2014, it was revealed that For the Love of Dogs had been nominated for a third National Television Award, this time under the category 'Most Popular Factual Programme'. But it lost out to Gogglebox.

The show was also nominated for a BAFTA for 'Best Features Programme' in 2013.

References

External links

2012 British television series debuts
2010s British documentary television series
2020s British documentary television series
English-language television shows
ITV (TV network) original programming
Television series by ITV Studios
Television shows about dogs
Television shows set in London
Paul O'Grady